The pound is the currency of the Falkland Islands, a British Overseas Territory in the South Atlantic Ocean. The symbol is the pound sign, £. The ISO 4217 currency code is FKP.

The Falkland Islands pound has always been pegged to sterling at par and banknotes of both currencies are used interchangeably on the islands (although only notes issued by banks in the United Kingdom are generally accepted in Britain itself).

History

The pound was introduced following the reassertion of sovereignty in the Falklands Islands by the British in 1833. Initially, sterling coin circulated, in units of a pound subdivided into 20 shillings, each of 12 pence. Specific issues of banknotes have been made for the Falkland Islands since 1899. In 1971, the pound was decimalised and subdivided into 100 pence. Coins have been minted specifically for the Falklands since 1974.

For a more general history of currency in the South Atlantic region, see British currency in the South Atlantic and the Antarctic.

Legislative basis
In Falkland Islands law, the Currency Ordinance 1987 states that the Falkland Islands pound is the currency of the Falkland Islands, and that it has parity with the pound sterling.

References to 'pounds' in the Falklands Islands (such as in contracts and debts) refer to the Falkland Islands pound.

Falkland Island pounds can be exchanged for sterling on demand, but the Currency Commissioners are entitled to charge a percentage fee for doing so.

Coins

In 1974, 1, 2, 5 and 10 pence coins were introduced. 50 pence coins were introduced in 1980, followed by 20 pence in 1982, £1 in 1987 and a circulating £2 in 2004. The halfpenny coin was last issued in 1983 and was demonetised shortly after. Smaller versions of the 5p, 10p and 50p, corresponding to the current UK issues, were issued in 1998, replacing the larger versions (which for the 5p was eight years after its introduction in the UK). The introduction of the circulation £2 coin in 2004 was six years after the same coin was issued in the UK. In 2020, the Falklands Islands issued a new 12-sided bi-metallic £1 coin, matching both the composition and size of its UK counterpart, while also announcing the withdrawal of the round £1 coin in January 2023, with the assistance of the Royal Mint. All the coins have the same composition and size as the corresponding British coins.

Banknotes

Between 1899 and 1901, the government introduced notes for 5/- and 10/-, £1 and £5. 5/- notes were issued until 1916. Following decimalisation in 1971, the 10/- note of the preceding issue became the new 50-pence note, though it retained its old design. £10 notes were introduced in 1975, followed by £20 in 1984 and £50 in 1990. Banknotes in circulation are:
£5 (red)
£10 (green)
£20 (brown)
£50 (blue, green and red combination)

Falkland Islands' banknotes feature the same images, differing only in their respective denominations and corresponding colours. On the front side, all notes depict a portrait of Queen Elizabeth II, the Falklands' coat of arms, a small map of the islands, and images of two of the islands' main animals: penguins and sea lions. On the back, notes feature pictures of Christ Church Cathedral in Stanley and Government House, the official residence of the governor of the Falkland Islands.

Banknotes are printed by De la Rue plc on behalf of the Falkland Island Commissioners of Currency.  In 2010 an order was placed for the printing of 200,000 £10 banknotes and for 200,000 £20 banknotes which would represent a supply of banknotes that would last for 15 to 20 years.

See also
 Economy of the Falkland Islands

References

Currencies of the British Empire
Currencies of British Overseas Territories
Currencies of the Commonwealth of Nations
Pound
Fixed exchange rate
1833 introductions
Currencies of South America